The Weblog Awards may refer to:

 The Weblog Awards (Bloggies), presented since 2001
 The Weblog Awards (Wizbang), presented from 2003 through 2008

See also
 Blog award, an award for the best blog in a given category